The Parallel High Performance Preconditioners (hypre) is a library of routines for scalable (parallel) solution of linear systems. The built-in BLOPEX package in addition allows solving eigenvalue problems. The main strength of Hypre is availability of high performance parallel multigrid preconditioners for both structured and unstructured grid problems.

Currently, Hypre supports only real double-precision arithmetic. Hypre uses the Message Passing Interface  (MPI) standard for all message-passing communication.  PETSc has an interface to call Hypre preconditioners.

Hypre is being developed and is supported by members of the Scalable Linear Solvers project within the Lawrence Livermore National Laboratory.

Features 

hypre provides the following features:
 Parallel vectors and  matrices, using several different interfaces
 Scalable parallel preconditioners
 Built-in BLOPEX

References

External links 
 Hypre home page
 PETSc home page
 BLOPEX home page

Numerical libraries
Numerical linear algebra
Scientific simulation software